Michael Michele Williams (born August 30, 1966) is an American actress and fashion designer. She began her career on stage before appearing opposite Wesley Snipes in the 1991 film New Jack City.

In the 1990s, Michele had leading roles in two CBS television series: crime drama Dangerous Curves (1992–93) and prime time soap opera Central Park West. Michele also had a role as Malik Yoba‘s love interest on the police drama New York Undercover. She later joined the cast of NBC police drama Homicide: Life on the Street (1998–99) playing Det. Rene Sheppard, and from 1999 to 2002 played Dr. Cleo Finch in the NBC medical drama ER. She also has appeared in the films The 6th Man (1997), Ali (2001), Dark Blue (2002) and How to Lose a Guy in 10 Days (2003). From 2017 to 2018, Michele starred as Ayanna Floyd in the Fox prime time soap opera Star, and in 2019 she joined The CW prime time soap opera Dynasty as Dominique Deveraux.

Early life
Michael Michele Williams was born in Evansville, Indiana, the elder of two daughters. Her father, Jerry, is a furniture-rental entrepreneur and her mother, Theresa, was employed by Bristol-Myers. She was named for her mother's best friend, Michael Ann. Michele attended Howard Roosa Elementary School (a K-8 school at the time) and Benjamin Bosse High School, where she was active on the basketball team.

Career
Michele has appeared in music videos by R&B singers Freddie Jackson and Eric Gable. In 1989 she sued actor Eddie Murphy in a high-profile Hollywood lawsuit alleging she was fired from the movie Harlem Nights for rejecting his romantic advances. "She had the role that's now being played by Jasmine Guy, from A Different World," Murphy told Rolling Stone. "The fact of the matter is, I wanted someone with greater marquee value than Michael Michele. She wasn't working out. As for her claim that I was touching her, realistically speaking, if you're gonna be a sleaze and try to sleep with somebody, you try to sleep with 'em before you give 'em the part… In her lawsuit, she says I tried to touch her, like I was a pervert. I never tried to touch this woman. We had, like, four conversations, each time with up to sixty people around us on a sound stage. But the lawsuit itself didn't bother me. Lawsuits for me are an occupational hazard."  Michele's suit was later settled out of court for an undisclosed sum.

In 1991, Michele had a starring role opposite Wesley Snipes in the 1991 film New Jack City directed by Mario Van Peebles. Despite the film's success, Michele did not have her next movie role until six years later, starring opposite Marlon Wayans in the comedy film The 6th Man. In 1992, she went on to star on the CBS late-night crime drama series Dangerous Curves, which ran for two seasons. In 1993, she played a leading role in the six-part NBC soap opera miniseries Trade Winds. The following year, she had a major recurring role in the Fox police drama series New York Undercover. She left the show in early 1995 to play one of the leads in the CBS prime time soap opera Central Park West alongside Mädchen Amick, Lauren Hutton and Raquel Welch. The series was not successful and was cancelled after two seasons in 1996.

In 1998, Michele joined the cast of NBC police drama Homicide: Life on the Street as Det. Rene Sheppard on the show's final season. She received her first NAACP Image Award for Outstanding Actress in a Drama Series nomination for this role. Michele reprised her role in a Law & Order episode in 1999 and in the television movie Homicide: The Movie in 2000. She later joined another NBC series, medical drama ER playing Dr. Cleo Finch from 1999 to 2002, for three seasons. She received another NAACP Image Award nomination.

In 2001, Michele played Veronica Porché Ali in the biographical drama film Ali opposite Will Smith. She later had two more movie roles: crime drama Dark Blue (2002) and romantic comedy How to Lose a Guy in 10 Days (2003). She returned to television in 2004, with a starring role in the short-lived UPN legal drama series Kevin Hill opposite Taye Diggs. In 2007, she guest starred on Law & Order: Special Victims Unit and in two episodes of House as a doctor who had previously worked with the CIA. In 2009, Michele starred in the Hallmark Channel film Relative Stranger with fellow ER cast member Eriq La Salle. In 2011, Michele had a recurring role on the CW teen drama Gossip Girl. In the late 2000s and early 2010s, Michele also starred in a number of unsold television pilots.

In 2017, Michele returned to series regular work playing villainous Ayanna Floyd, president of the record label, in the Fox prime time soap opera Star. Her character was described as a modern-day black Alexis Carrington. She also was cast in a recurring role in the Oprah Winfrey Network drama series Queen Sugar.

On March 22, 2019, it was announced that Michele had been cast as Dominique Deveraux for later in the second season of the Dynasty reboot series.

Personal life
She has a son, born in 2004.

In 2005, TV Guide ranked Michele # 36 on its "50 Sexiest Stars of All Time" list. In 2012, she was named one of the "50 Hottest Biracial Women" by Complex Magazine.

Filmography

Film

Television

Music video appearances
Freddie Jackson:
 "Have You Ever Loved Somebody" (1986)
 "Nice and Slow" (1988)
 "I Don't Want to Lose Your Love" (1988)
 "Make Love Easy" (1993)

Eric Gable:
 "Remember the First Time" (1989)
 "Can't Wait To Get You Home" (1991)

Awards and nominations

References

External links
 
 
 

1966 births
African-American actresses
African-American fashion designers
American fashion designers
American film actresses
American television actresses
Actresses from Indiana
Living people
Actors from Evansville, Indiana
20th-century American actresses
21st-century American actresses
20th-century African-American women
20th-century African-American people
21st-century African-American women
21st-century African-American people